This is a list of mosques in Cambodia.

See also
 Islam in Cambodia
 Lists of mosques

References

External links

 
Cambodia
Mosques